The Eparchy of Lugoj is an eparchy of the Romanian Greek Catholic Church.

Eparchs
Alexandru Dobra (16 Nov 1854 – 13 Apr 1870) 
Ioan Olteanu (29 Nov 1870 – 22 Dec 1873) 
Victor Mihaly de Apșa (21 Dec 1874 – 18 Mar 1895)
Dumitru Radu (3 Dec 1896 – 25 Jun 1903) 
Vasile Hossu (25 Jun 1903 – 16 Dec 1911) 
Valeriu Traian Frențiu (14 Dec 1912 – 25 Feb 1922)
Alexandru Nicolescu (25 Feb 1922 – 29 Aug 1936) 
Ioan Bălan (29 Aug 1936 – 4 Aug 1959)
Ioan Ploscaru (14 Mar 1990 – 30 Nov 1995)
Alexandru Mesian, coadjutor (20 Jul 1994 – 30 Nov 1995)
Alexandru Mesian (30 Nov 1995 – 11 Mar 2023)

References

Roman Catholic dioceses in Romania
Romanian Greek Catholic Church dioceses
Lugoj